Mal-e Shamab (also Romanized as Māl-e Shamāb; also known as Māl Shahāb) is a village in Liravi-ye Shomali Rural District, in the Central District of Deylam County, Bushehr Province, Iran. At the 2006 census, its population was 79, in 18 families.

References 

Populated places in Deylam County